José Berreyesa, Jose Berreyesa, José Berryessa, Jose Berryessa, José Berrelleza, or Jose Berrelleza may refer to:

 José de los Reyes Berreyesa (1785–1846), also written José R. Berreyesa and José Reyes Berreyesa
 José de los Santos Berreyesa (1817–1864), alcalde of Sonoma, California

See also 
 The José Berreyesa families of California